The Former Residence of Hu Yaobang or Hu Yaobang's Former Residence was built in the late Qing dynasty (1644–1911) and is located in Cangfang Village, Zhonghe Town, Liuyang, Hunan. It covers a building area of about  including buildings such as the old houses, Yaobang Square, the ancestral temple, the ancestral grave, the Cultural Relic Exhibition Hall, and the old well.

History
The residence was built by Hu Yaobang's great-grandfather Hu Mingzhong and Hu Mingzhong's elder brother Hu Mingjing in the Qing dynasty during the reign of the Xianfeng Emperor (1851–1862). 

On 13 November 1915, Hu Yaobang was born in the home.

In 1962, when Hu Yaobang returned home and visited it, he told his relatives not to rebuild the home. Despite this wish, the residence was rebuilt in February 1995 by the People's Government of Liuyang City. In September, Hu Yaobang's wife Li Zhao visited the residence. The next year, the residence was listed as a Hunan Province most important culture and relics site.

In 2002, it was listed as a Provincial Patriotic Education Base. In February 2005, the Cultural Relic Exhibition Hall was built. On 6 May 2013, it was listed as a "Major National Historical and Cultural Sites" by the State Council of China. On 12 April 2014, Hu Jintao visited the residence.

Gallery

References

Bibliography
 

Traditional folk houses in Hunan
Buildings and structures in Liuyang
Major National Historical and Cultural Sites in Hunan
Tourist attractions in Changsha